Gay Old Dog is a 1935 British comedy film directed by George King and starring Edward Rigby, Moore Marriott and Ruby Miller. It was a quota quickie made at Walton Studios.

Cast
 Edward Rigby as Tom Bliss  
 Moore Marriott as George Bliss  
 Ruby Miller as Mrs. Vernon 
 Marguerite Allan as Judith  
 Annie Esmond as Mrs. Gambit  
 Joan Wyndham as Betty  
 Patrick Barr as Phillip  
 John Singer as Andrew V. Oakes  
 Billy Holland as Captain Black  
 Vi Kaley 
 Norman Pierce 
 Ben Williams

References

Bibliography
 Chibnall, Steve. Quota Quickies: The Birth of the British 'B' Film. British Film Institute, 2007.
 Low, Rachael. Filmmaking in 1930s Britain. George Allen & Unwin, 1985.
 Wood, Linda. British Films, 1927-1939. British Film Institute, 1986.

External links

1935 films
British comedy films
1935 comedy films
Films directed by George King
Quota quickies
Films shot at Nettlefold Studios
Films set in England
RKO Pictures films
British black-and-white films
1930s English-language films
1930s British films